Oakley Township is located in Macon County, Illinois. As of the 2010 census, its population was 1,082 and it contained 475 housing units.

Cities and towns 
 Oakley
 Sangamon

Adjacent townships 
 Whitmore Township (northwest and north)
 Willow Branch Township, Piatt County (east)
 Cerro Gordo Township, Piatt County (east and southeast)
 Long Creek Township (south and southwest)
 Decatur Township (west)

Geography

Demographics

References

External links
City-data.com
Illinois State Archives

Townships in Macon County, Illinois
1859 establishments in Illinois
Populated places established in 1859
Townships in Illinois